Santiago Grondona (born 25 July 1998) is an Argentine rugby union player who plays for the Exeter Chiefs. On 21 November 2019, he was named in the Jaguares squad for the 2020 Super Rugby season. His playing position is Flanker.

References

External links
 itsrugby Profile

Jaguares (Super Rugby) players
Rugby union flankers
Argentine rugby union players
1998 births
Living people